The North Staffordshire Railway built, or had constructed for it, approximately 350 locomotives.  Until the company established Stoke railway works at Stoke-upon-Trent in 1864, a variety of engineering firms supplied locomotives.  Increasingly though, the company became more self-reliant and, by the beginning of the 20th century, virtually all new engines were produced at Stoke works.

The North Staffordshire Railway became part of the London, Midland and Scottish Railway (LMS) in 1923 and its locomotives were taken into LMS stock.  With the engine standardisation policy of the LMS, under the chairmanship of Sir Josiah Stamp, the relatively small number of NSR locomotives made them obvious candidates for early withdrawal and scrapping.  Withdrawals started in 1927 and by April 1939 all locomotives in the capital stock had been withdrawn.

Standard gauge locomotives

Engines renumbered with "A" as a suffix to the number were said to be on the duplicate list.  The duplicate list comprised engines coming towards the end of their working lives and allowed the numbers to be freed up for use by new stock and in many cases to allow classes of new engines to be numbered in consecutive series.

Notes

Narrow gauge locomotives

References

Notes

Sources

North Staffordshire Railway
North Staffordshire Railway
North Staffordshire Railway